Robert Powell III is a stand-up comedian and political satirist best known for his work as part of Shaquille O’Neal's All-Star Comedy Jam, on HBO's All Def Comedy, and as an Emmy nominated guest star on Donald Glover's Atlanta on FX.

Notable work

 Robert Powell portrayed the barber Bibby in season 2, episode 5 of Atlanta, which received an Outstanding Writing for a Comedy Series nomination at the 70th Primetime Emmy Awards.
 In March 2019, UberEats selected Powell to serves as an Ad Spokesperson "Randy Watkins" for UberEats March Madness Campaign. 
 Robert Powell also stars as himself in Adidas James Harden's "Free to Be Campaign."
 Starbucks selected Powell to serves as the Ad Spokesperson for the unveiling of their 2020 Christmas Cup Campaign.
 California Pizza Kitchen also recruited Robert Powell to serves as an Ad Spokesperson as a part of UberEats Tracking Campaign Ad.

Political career
In his career in politics, he was Deputy Chief of Staff to the Mayor of his hometown, Monroe, Louisiana, Special Assistant to Louisiana Governor Bobby Jindal, and Chief of Staff to Secretary of Labor Johnny Myles Riley.  Powell attended the University of Louisiana at Monroe, and has a master's degree in Political Science from Texas Christian University.

Acting & comedy career
Thus far in Powell's career he has worked collaboratively with Stacy Wall, Norman Lear, Shaq, Russell Simmons, HBO, California Pizza Kitchen, Adidas, Uber, UberEats, Starbucks, Subway, Andreas Nilsson, McDonald’s, Chloe and Hallie, Josh Forbes, Becky G, and Magic Johnson. Powell currently serves as President and Executive Director of his grandfather's foundation.

References

 
 
 

Living people
American stand-up comedians
Year of birth missing (living people)
University of Louisiana at Monroe alumni
Texas Christian University alumni
People from Monroe, Louisiana
Politicians from Monroe, Louisiana
American television producers